"Quanto Ao Tempo"(Regarding Time) is a song performed by the Brazilian singer Ivete Sangalo, released as the third single from her album Pode Entrar, released on August 18 on the radio stations.

The song is a soul duet with Carlinhos Brown and was recorded in late 2008.

Reception
The song received generally positive reviews from the critics, that considers the song "a great ballad, with strong and beautiful lyrics and a perfect duo".

Music video
The music video was released in August on the Multishow channel.

Chart performance
The song debuted on the Salvador Hot Songs at #6.

Charts

References

2009 singles
Songs written by Carlinhos Brown
Ivete Sangalo songs
2009 songs
Universal Music Group singles